National Youth Service may refer to:
National Youth Service (Kenya) 
National Youth Service Corps (Nigeria)
National Youth Service (Seychelles)
National Youth Service (Zimbabwe)